Jacques Cossette-Trudel (February 15, 1947 – March 14, 2023) was a Canadian who kidnapped British diplomat James Cross in the October Crisis of 1970 in Canada. Cossette-Trudel was a member of a cell of the Front de libération du Québec (FLQ) that kidnapped Cross in an attempt to start an uprising in Quebec, leading to its separation from Canada. Exchanged along with the rest of his cell for a healthy Cross, he went into exile in Cuba and France. After his return, he was convicted of the offence of kidnapping and served time in prison. He has since worked as a communication counsellor and filmmaker in Quebec.

Political activism and October Crisis
Cossette-Trudel was born on February 15, 1947. While a student at the Université du Québec à Montréal he became active in left wing politics with the Groupe Marxiste Revolutionnaire, a Quebec-based part of The Waffle, a radical wing of Canada's New Democratic Party. In May 1968, he was deeply involved in Montreal in the organization of the student movement for the democratization of the education system. Soon after, Cossette-Trudel's views became more extreme and he joined the Front de libération du Québec,  whose members were responsible for a decade of radical manifestos, bombings and armed robberies in the Province of Quebec.

While still a student, he met and married another radical leftist, Louise Lanctôt. During what became known as the October Crisis, as the leader of the FLQ's Liberation Cell, on October 5, 1970, Jacques Cossette-Trudel along with his wife Louise, her brother Jacques Lanctôt, Yves Langlois, Nigel Hamer, and Marc Carbonneau abducted James Cross, the British Trade Commissioner, from his Montreal home, demanding the release of 27 convicted FLQ militants and the publication of the group's political manifesto. The Government of Canada, at the invitation of the Quebec provincial government, responded with the adoption of the War Measures Act. Under this law, 500 citizens were jailed and 10,000 Canadian soldiers were deployed on the streets of Montreal. Believing many of their fellow citizens would join an uprising, the goal of the FLQ was to create an independent socialist state based on the ideals of Fidel Castro's Cuba and the Algerian revolution.

Early in December 1970, police discovered the location of Cossette-Trudel's Liberation Cell hideout. The safe release of their hostage, Cross, was negotiated and on December 3, 1970, after Cossette-Trudel, his wife, and the other known members of his cell were granted safe passage to Cuba, with approval from Fidel Castro, Cross was released.

Exile
Jacques Cossette-Trudel and his wife remained in Cuba for four years. They worked as volunteers for the Cuban press agency Prensa Latina. Their son, Alexis Cossette-Trudel was born in 1972. In 1974, they moved to France as political asylum seekers. Although asylum was refused, they were permitted to remain in France. Their second child, Marie-Ange Cossette-Trudel, was born in France in 1974.

Conviction and imprisonment
On October 13, 1977, Quebec Premier René Lévesque announced he was seeking a pardon for Jacques Cossette-Trudel and his wife. The Government of Canada consented to their return and put them on trial. On December 13, 1978, they pleaded guilty at trial in Montreal and were sentenced to five years' probation and two years in a provincial jail for their part in the kidnapping and attempted extortion. They were freed on parole after serving eight months.

After prison
Since divorced from his wife, Jacques Cossette-Trudel has made a living as a communication counsellor in provincial health and social institutions. Since 2000, he has been a successful screenwriter and filmmaker and has received financial assistance from Téléfilm Canada and the Sodec for his work.

According to a 2000 interview he gave to Radio-Canada television, Jacques Cossette-Trudel has always stayed very connected politically and still believed in an independent, multicultural and socialist state of Quebec.

Cossette-Trudel died on March 14, 2023, at the age of 76.

References

Sources
Nobody said no: the real story about how the Mounties always get their man
 F.L.Q.: the anatomy of an underground movement - Page 213
 Crimes of the secret police - Page 27

1947 births
2023 deaths
Film producers from Quebec
Canadian male screenwriters
People from Shawinigan
Writers from Quebec
Université du Québec à Montréal alumni
Canadian people convicted of kidnapping
Liberation Cell members
Canadian expatriates in Cuba
French Quebecers